Imam Saad bin Aqil' Shrine was a mosque, hussainiyah and mausoleum located at Tal Afar, Iraq. The complex contained the tomb of Imam Saad Bin Aqil, a descendant of Aqeel ibn Abi Talib. A smaller mausoleum with a white dome was located next to the mausoleum. Sheikh Jawad Al-Sadiq Mosque was next to the mosque and shrine.
A few years later, a reconstruction started of the mausoleum.

Incidents  
The mausoleum was demolished in 2014 by ISIL militants. They claimed the complex was a place to "worship" Husayn Ibn Ali.

Reconstruction 
The shrine was rebuilt in 2019, alongside other major Shiite shrines including the Mosque of Sayyid Ar-Mahmoud and Sheikh Jawad Al-Sadiq Mosque.

References 

Hussainiya
Mausoleums in Iraq
Buildings and structures demolished in 2014